Mala Subotica (Kajkavian: Murska Sobotica) is a village and municipality in Međimurje County, Croatia.

The village of Mala Subotica is located around 7 kilometres south-east of Čakovec, the county seat and largest city of Međimurje County, and had a population of 1,986 in the 2011 census. During the same census, the entire municipality had a population of 5,452, with 4,728 people identifying themselves as Croats.

Mala Subotica is famous for its developed underground music scene, which comes as a surprise since the village has population of just 2,000 people.

In addition to Mala Subotica, there were five other villages belonging to the municipality during the 2011 census:
Držimurec – 388 people
Palovec – 984 people
Piškorovec – 672 people
Strelec – 296 people
Sveti Križ – 410 people
Štefanec – 716 people

Notes

References

External links
Municipality's website 

Municipalities of Croatia
Populated places in Međimurje County